Alain Lemercier (born 11 January 1957) is a retired male race walker from Flers, Orne, France, who competed in two consecutive Summer Olympics (1988 and 1992) during his career.

Achievements

References
sports-reference

1957 births
Living people
French male racewalkers
Olympic athletes of France
Athletes (track and field) at the 1988 Summer Olympics
Athletes (track and field) at the 1992 Summer Olympics
Sportspeople from Orne